Elie Hervier (15 February 1896 – 5 January 1987) was a French sculptor. His work was part of the sculpture event in the art competition at the 1924 Summer Olympics.

References

External links
 

1896 births
1987 deaths
20th-century French sculptors
French male sculptors
Olympic competitors in art competitions
Sculptors from Paris